Ursa Major (Latin 'great bear') is an area of the sky, a constellation.

Ursa Major may also refer to:
 Big Dipper, a pattern of stars (an asterism) within the constellation
 Ursa Major I Dwarf and Ursa Major II Dwarf, two nearby dwarf spherical galaxies visible in the constellation
 Ursa Major (album), by Third Eye Blind
 Ursa Major (character), a fictional character
 Ursa Major (excavator), a piece of mining equipment
 Ursa Major (sculpture), by William Underhill
 Ursa Major Technologies, an American aerospace company

See also
 Flag of Alaska with Ursa Major